Jung Jae-soon is a South Korean actress. She is known for her roles in dramas such as Homemade Love Story, My Only One, House of Bluebird and Three Bold Siblings. She also appeared in movies Let's Look at the Sky Sometimes, Our Class Accepts Anyone Regardless Of Grade, Carnivorous Animal, Longing for Love, and Let's Look at the Sky Sometimes.

Filmography

Television series

Film

Awards and nominations

References

External links 
 
 

1947 births
20th-century South Korean actresses
Living people
21st-century South Korean actresses
South Korean television actresses
South Korean film actresses